RPM was a Canadian magazine that published the best-performing singles of Canada from 1964 to 2000. Seventeen singles peaked atop the RPM Singles Chart in 1993. "I Will Always Love You" by Whitney Houston held the top position from 1992 into 1993, and Bryan Adams achieved the final number-one hit of the year with "Please Forgive Me". Six musical acts peaked at number one in Canada for the first time this year: Boy George, P.M. Dawn, Soul Asylum, Meat Loaf, Blind Melon, and Ace of Base. Whitney Houston was the only artist to peak at number one more than once.

The only Canadian to top the chart this year was Bryan Adams. Whitney Houston had the most successful single of the year with her cover of Dolly Parton's "I Will Always Love You", which topped the chart for eight weeks in January and February 1993. Together with "I Have Nothing", Houston totalled eleven weeks at the summit. Janet Jackson and Mariah Carey both spent six weeks at number one with "That's the Way Love Goes" and "Dreamlover", respectively, while Duran Duran topped the RPM Singles Chart for five weeks with "Ordinary World". The other acts that spent at least three weeks at number one were Sting, Tina Turner, Soul Asylum, and Bryan Adams.

Chart history

Notes

See also
1993 in music
List of Billboard Hot 100 number ones of 1993

References

External links
 Read about RPM Magazine at the AV Trust
 Search RPM charts here at Library and Archives Canada

 
1993 record charts
1993